Robert Walter McElroy (born February 5, 1954) is an American prelate of the Catholic Church who has served as the sixth bishop of the Diocese of San Diego in California since 2015. 

McElroy was educated by the Sulpicians at St. Joseph High School Seminary and St. Patrick Seminary in California, and was ordained a priest for the Archdiocese of San Francisco in 1980. He later received advance theological degrees from Santa Clara University and the Pontifical Gregorian University and has written articles for America, the official magazine of the Jesuits in the United States. Pope Francis created him a cardinal on August 27, 2022.

Early life and education
Robert McElroy was born into a Catholic family in San Francisco, California, on February 5, 1954. One of five children, he was born to Walter and Roberta McElroy.  He grew up in San Mateo county. He earned a B.A. in history from Harvard University in Cambridge, Massachusetts, in 1975 and an M.A. in American history from Stanford University in Stanford, California, in 1976.

In 1979, McElroy graduated from St. Patrick's Seminary in Menlo Park, California, where he earned an Master of Divinity degree. In 1985, McElroy obtained an Licentiate of Sacred Theology from the Jesuit School of Theology of Santa Clara University in Berkeley, California, with a thesis entitled Freedom for Faith: John Courtney Murray and the Constitutional Question, 1942-1954. In 1986, McElroy obtained a Doctor of Sacred Theology degree in moral theology from the Pontifical Gregorian University in Rome, Italy, with a dissertation entitled John Courtney Murray and the Secular Crisis: Foundations for an American Catholic Public Theology.  He also received a Doctor of Political Science degree from Stanford in 1989 with a dissertation entitled Morality and American Foreign Policy : The Role of Moral Norms in International Affairs.

Priesthood 
On April 12, 1980, McElroy was ordained to the priesthood by Archbishop John Raphael Quinn at St. Mary's Cathedral for the Archdiocese of San Francisco. McElroy was assigned to a pastoral position in St. Cecilia Parish in San Francisco, California. From 1982 to 1985, McElroy served as secretary to Archbishop John Quinn. In 1983, McElroy was one of three priests who drafted a report for the archdiocesan Priests' Senate entitled "Ministry and Sexuality in the Archdiocese of San Francisco" that stated that "the homosexual orientation is not held to be a sinful condition" but called homosexual persons to "[live] out the demands of chastity within that orientation," endorsing a gradualist approach that "assists the person toward a progressive assimilation of the church's ethical values."

From 1989 to 1995, he was parochial vicar at Saint Pius Church in Redwood City, California. In 1995, Archbishop Quinn appointed McElroy to be vicar general of the archdiocese, an office he held under Archbishop Quinn and Cardinal William Levada until 1997. In 1996, McElroy was made an honorary prelate by Pope John Paul II. From 1997 to 2010, McElroy served as the pastor of St. Gregory Church in San Mateo, California.

As a priest, McElroy authored The Search for an American Public Theology: The Contribution of John Courtney Murray (Paulist Press, 1989) and Morality and American Foreign Policy: The Role of Ethics in International Affairs (Princeton University Press, 1992). He has written four articles for America magazine.

In 2005, McElroy published an essay on the denial of the Eucharist to public officials because of their political positions. He criticized those who adopt what he called the "sanctions position" for a lack of "pastoral solicitude", noted the expansion of grounds for sanctions from abortion to euthanasia and other issues by one diocese or another, questioned the lack of clarity as to what behavior triggers sanctions, and cited the occasions when  John Paul II distributed the Eucharist to political leaders who favored legalized abortion. He proposed that the church's traditional "theology of scandal" should be invoked rather than employing Eucharistic practice as a means of discipline. He warned that imposing sanctions on individuals harms the church by appearing coercive, strengthens the argument of abortion advocates that the church is attempting to impose its religious beliefs on society at large, downplays the breadth of the church's social agenda, and tends to "cast the church as a partisan actor in the American political system."

McElroy taught ethics at Saint Patrick's Seminary and University in Menlo Park, California, and was guest professor of social ethics at the University of San Francisco in the Fall of 2008.

Episcopal Ministry

Auxiliary Bishop of San Francisco

On July 6, 2010, McElroy was appointed an auxiliary bishop for the Archdiocese of San Francisco and titular bishop of Gemellae in Byzacena by Pope Benedict XVI.  On September 7, 2010, McElroy received his episcopal consecration from Archbishop George  Niederauer,with Archbishop Emeritus Quinn and Bishop John  Wester serving as co-consecrators. As auxiliary bishop, McElroy was the archdiocesan vicar for parish life and development.

Writing in America in 2014, McElroy argued that the emphasis of Pope Francis on inequality in Catholic social teaching

Bishop of San Diego

On March 3, 2015, McElroy was appointed the sixth Bishop of San Diego by  Francis, succeeding the late Bishop Cirilo Flores. The diocese serves about one million Catholics in San Diego and Imperial counties. His installation took place on April 15, 2015, at St. Therese of Carmel Catholic Church.

McElroy is widely regarded as a supporter of the progressive policies of  Francis.  He has written frequently and extensively on social inequality and the Church's social justice mission. In his first public appearance in San Diego, he pledged to champion the cause of the homeless, to support comprehensive immigration reform, and to ban anyone who has abused minors from serving in the clergy or other employment in the diocese.

In a discussion over the formation of the 2015 document "Forming Consciences for Faithful Citizenship" by the United States Conference of Catholic Bishops (USCCB), McElroy argued that the document focused excessively on abortion and euthanasia. He said that "alongside the issues of abortion and euthanasia, which are central issues in our effort to transform this world, poverty and the degradation of the earth are also central. But this document keeps to the structure of the world view of 2007. It tilts in favor of abortion and euthanasia and excludes poverty and the environment." He called for the document to be scrapped entirely. His comments were reported to have visibly irritated Cardinal Daniel DiNardo, who was then serving as vice president of the USCCB and who later became its president. In a speech delivered on February 17, 2016, McElroy called on Catholics "to recognize and confront the ugly tide of anti-Islamic bigotry" in the United States. He denounced as "repeated falsehoods" claims that Islam is a violent religion and compared these allegations to 19th century anti-Catholicism in America.

McElroy is currently the vice-president of the California Catholic Conference and serves at the USCCB on the administrative committee, the ecumenical committee, the committee on domestic justice and the committee on international affairs.In 2017 he preached at the funeral of Archbishop Quinn.

McElroy, like most members of the Church hierarchy, including  Francis and the USCCB, opposed plans by U.S. President Donald Trump to a build a wall along the Mexico–United States border to limit illegal immigration. In March 2018, Trump visited California to view prototypes for the wall. After the visit, McElroy said, "It is a sad day for our country when we trade the majestic, hope-filled symbolism of the Statue of Liberty for an ineffective and grotesque wall, which both displays and inflames the ethnic and cultural divisions that have long been the underside of our national history."At a 2018 meeting, McElroy was asked by several lay Catholics about an openly gay man, Aaron Bianco, who was working at St. John the Evangelist Parish. In response to one of their questions, McElroy said, "If the Church eliminated all the employees who are not living out the teachings of the Church in its fullness, we would be employing only angels."

In 2020, three weeks prior to the US presidential election, McElroy criticized those questioning Biden's personal Catholic faith based on his positions on abortion, characterizing "the public denial of candidates' identity as Catholics because of a specific policy position they have taken" as "an assault on the meaning of what it is to be Catholic." McElroy said that although acts of abortion are intrinsically evil, legislation about it is a matter of prudential judgement, though he noted that the commitment to reducing the numbers of abortions that occur "has been eviscerated in the Democratic Party in a capitulation to notions of privacy that simply block out the human identity and rights of unborn children." McElroy stated that Catholic identity does not stand or fall on a single policy position. Catholic social teaching and identity encompasses such things as solidarity, compassion, love for the church, and "having a grace-filled relationship with God".

On May 29, 2022  Francis announced his intention to make McElroy a cardinal on August 27, 2022. On  August 27, 2022, Pope Francis made him a cardinal priest, assigning him the title of San Frumenzio ai Prati Fiscali.

McCarrick Affair

In 2016, McElroy had two meetings with psychotherapist and clerical sex abuse expert Richard Sipe, during which Sipe made allegations about current and former bishops. McElroy had asked Sipe for any corroborating material to substantiate his allegations. McElroy later stated, "I asked if he could share this information with me, especially since some of his accusations involved persons still active in the life of the Church. Dr. Sipe said that he was precluded from sharing specific documentary information that corroborated his claims." Subsequently, Sipe had a letter discussing alleged sexual misconduct by retired Cardinal Theodore McCarrick and other clerics, disguised as a major donation, hand-delivered to McElroy's office by a process server. In addition to delivering the letter to McElroy, Sipe published the letter publicly on his website.

A wide variety of allegations of sexual assault against adults and minors against McCarrick became public knowledge in June 2018 after an allegation of sex abuse of a minor was deemed credible by the Vatican. Subsequently, McElroy released a statement in which he acknowledged meeting with Sipe and receiving his letter, but stated that "After I read [the letter], I wrote to Dr. Sipe and told him that his decision to engage a process server who operated under false pretenses, and his decision to copy his letter to me to a wide audience, made further conversations at a level of trust impossible." McElroy further stated that "Dr. Sipe made many significant contributions to understanding the dimensions of clergy sexual abuse in the United States and to the assistance of victims. But the limitations on his willingness to share corroborating information made it impossible to know what was real and what was rumor."A 2018 article in America reported that "[McElroy] said that the material he received from Mr. Sipe was passed on to the proper governing bodies in Rome."

Eucharist, LGBT and criticism

In America, McElroy called for a change in sacramental discipline related to the reception of communion by sexually active LGBT people. He emphasized "the privileged place" of conscience and that sexual activity does not lie at the heart of the hierarchy of truths. He also said: "The distinction between orientation and activity cannot be the principal focus for such a pastoral embrace because it inevitably suggests dividing the L.G.B.T. community into those who refrain from sexual activity and those who do not."

Reacting to the article, Stephen White, executive director of The Catholic Project at the Catholic University of America in Washington, D.C., noted that he did not see any discussion of sin, "the very thing Christ died to save us from," nor confession, "a remedy for even the gravest of sins," and thus "the fundamental drama of salvation – the very substance of the Good News – is obscured." He pointed out Jesus' teaching “If you love me, you will keep my commandments” as the basis for saying that "the reason God gives us the moral law is precisely to guide us toward those actions and habits that bring us closer to Him and to our neighbor." 

Reverend Raymond de Souza, writing for National Catholic Register, considered McElroy's article "an attack on Church teaching on sexuality" which is "a pastoral disaster," because McElroy's position that sexual activity outside marriage (for instance, same-sex sexual acts) should not be an impediment to the reception of communion means "the abolition of chastity." "Jettisoning the distinction between 'orientation and activity' in sexual matters means the end of chastity as a virtue to be strived for. Or, at the very least, implies a view that 'the L.B.G.T. community' is not capable of chastity and should therefore be preached a lesser gospel."

George Weigel and Archbishop Samuel Aquila criticized McElroy's idea of inclusion since Jesus "practiced some serious exclusion" and demanded radical discipleship that allowed people to refuse it and thus are distinguished from the true disciples. Weigel pointed out Jesus' "exclusion" of the blasphemers against the Holy Spirit (Mark 3:29), the pitiless (Matthew 25:41) and those who tempt the innocent (Luke 17:2); while Aquila referred to the rich young man (cf. Mk 10:17–22), the people who did not welcome the Gospel brought by the visiting disciples (Mt 10:14) and those who did not accept the teaching on the Bread of Life and left Jesus (cf. Jn 6:66).

See also
 Cardinals created by Pope Francis

References

External links
 
 Roman Catholic Diocese of San Diego Official Site
 Profile page at Roman Catholic Archdiocese of San Francisco

 

1954 births
Living people
People from San Francisco
Harvard University alumni
Graduate Theological Union alumni
Stanford University alumni
Pontifical Gregorian University alumni
Writers from San Francisco
21st-century Roman Catholic bishops in the United States
Roman Catholic Archdiocese of San Francisco
Roman Catholic bishops of San Diego
21st-century American cardinals
Cardinals created by Pope Francis